WB Group is a Polish electronics and aeronautics manufacturer, and one of Europe's largest private defence contractors. The company was established in 1997 and is based in Ożarów Mazowiecki. Through its various subsidiaries, WB produces military communications equipment, command and control systems, fire-control systems, unmanned aerial vehicles, and loitering munitions.

WB Electronics Warmate is being used by the Ukraine during the Russian invasion.  The FONET vehicle and battlefield communication system was licensed to L3Harris Technologies and is used by the United States Armed Forces.

Acquisitions

Flytronic 
In 2009 WB acquired the UAV startup Flytronic, which had created the  UAV now flown by the Polish Territorial Defence Force and by the Armed Forces of Ukraine under the WB Electronics brand.

Radmor 
Zakłady Radiowe Radmor was a radio equipment manufacturer formed at the Gdańsk University of Technology in 1947. After it expanded from marine-oriented equipment to home audio during the Soviet era, the company was re-privatized in 1994 and the focus on public service radios was restored. Radmor began collaborating with the French Thales conglomerate even before Poland's accession to NATO, and was one of the early members of the consortium developing the European Secure Software-defined Radio.

Arex

MindMade

Polish Development Fund 
In 2017 the Polish Development Fund, a fund of the Polish Treasury, invested PLN 128 million (EUR 30 million or USD 34 million at the time) in the WB Group, in exchange for 24% of shares.

External links 

https://www.wbgroup.pl/en/ – official website in English language

References 

Defence companies of Poland
Technology companies established in 1997